The eleventh season of the Russian reality talent show The Voice premiered on March 3, 2023 on Channel One. Following the conclusion of the tenth season, the panelist was entirely renewed as none of the coaches and host from last season returned. Polina Gagarina and Basta returned as coaches. Vladimir Presnyakov and Anton Belyaev joined the show as new coaches, whereas Yana Churikova joined as host.

Coaches and presenter
On February 6, 2023, Channel One announced that Polina Gagarina and Basta would be returning as coaches after one season break along with two new coaches — Vladimir Presnyakov and Anton Belyaev, who was a semi-finalist during the show's second season. 

Dmitry Nagiev didn't return as the show's presenter and was replaced by Yana Churikova.

Teams
Colour key

Blind auditions
The feature The Best coach of the season (in each episode) was applied again this season.
Colour key

A new feature of blind auditions this season is a block that each coach can use three times to prevent one of the other coaches from getting a contestant.

The coaches performed "Livin' la Vida Loca" at the start of the show.

Best Coach
Colour key

Notes

References

2021 Russian television seasons
The Voice (Russian TV series)